This is a list of Māori deities, known in Māori as .

Major departmental deities 
Haumiatiketike, the god of uncultivated food, particularly bracken fern.
Papatūānuku, the primordial earth mother.
Ranginui, the primordial sky father.
Rongomātāne, the god of cultivated foods, particularly sweet potato.
Tānemahuta, the god of forests and birds.
Tangaroa, the god of the ocean and the creatures within.
Tāwhirimātea, the god of storms and violent weather.
Tūmatauenga, the god of war, hunting, cooking, fishing, and food cultivation.
Whiro, the lord of darkness and embodiment of all evil and death.
Aituā, the god of death, happiness, and misfortune.
Ao, a personification of light.
Auahitūroa, the personification of comets, and the origin of the fire.
Haere, several personifications of the rainbow.
Ikatere, a fish god and father of all sea creatures.
Io Matua Kore, the supreme being; personification of light and the world of the living and the forest.
Kahukura, a war god who appears as the upper bow of a double rainbow.
Kiwa, one of several divine guardians of the ocean.
Makeatutara, the father of Māui and guardian of the underworld.
Maru, the god of freshwater, southern god of war.
Mataaho, a god of earthquakes and volcanoes from the Tāmaki Makaurau Region (Auckland).
Māui, a demigod, culture hero, and trickster.
Pūhaorangi, a celestial being who descended from the heavens to sleep with the beautiful maiden Te Kuraimonoa.
Punga or Hairi, the ancestor of sharks, lizards, rays, and all deformed, ugly things.
Rehua, the star god with the power of healing.
Rongomai, the name of a number of separate beings.
Rongo, the god of crops and peace
Ruaumoko, the god of volcanoes, earthquakes, and seasons.
Tamanuiterā, the personification of the sun.
Tane-rore, the personification of shimmering air.
Tāwhaki, a semi-supernatural being associated with thunder and lightning.
Te Uira, the personification of lightning.
Tiki, the first human, but sometimes is a child of Rangi and Papa, and creates the first human.
Tinirau, a guardian of fish.
Tūtewehiwehi, the father of all reptiles.
Uenuku, a god of the rainbow, associated with war. Also a deified ancestor.
Urutengangana, the god of the light.

Female atua 
Ārohirohi, the goddess of mirages and shimmering heat.
Hina, sister, or uncommonly, wife of Māui, associated with the moon.
Hinekapea, the goddess of loyalty.
Hinehōaka, the goddess of sandstone, the  Whatipū is her guardian.
Hinenuitepō, the goddess of night and death, and ruler of the underworld.
Hinepūkohurangi, the goddess of the mist
Ikaroa, the long fish that gave birth to all the stars in the Milky Way.
Kui, the chthonic demigod.
Mahuika, the goddess of fire.
Moekahu, a lesser known  goddess (or god) of Tūhoe whose form was of a dog, and a sibling of Haere.
Rohe, the goddess of the spirit world.
Tangotango, a celestial woman who fell in love with the great hero Tāwhaki and came to earth to become his wife.
Tūāwhiorangi, the wife of Kahukura who manifests as the lower bow during a double rainbow.
Whaitiri, the personification of thunder.

See also

 Family tree of the Māori gods
 Māori mythology

Maori
Deities, Maori